Alatrofloxacin (Trovan IV) is a fluoroquinolone antibiotic developed by Pfizer, delivered as a mesylate salt.

Trovafloxacin and alatrofloxacin were both withdrawn from the U.S. market in June 2006 due to hepatotoxicity leading to liver transplant or death.

See also 
 Fluoroquinolones

References 

Fluoroquinolone antibiotics
Prodrugs
Hepatotoxins
Withdrawn drugs
Naphthyridines
Carboxylic acids